Pennside is a census-designated place in Lower Alsace and Exeter Townships in Berks County, Pennsylvania, United States.  It is located approximately four miles east of the city of Reading.  As of the 2010 census, the population was 4,215 residents.

Demographics

References

Populated places in Berks County, Pennsylvania